Serdal is a Turkish given name for males. It is directly derived from the name Serdar and is used interchangeably of each other. People named Serdal include:

 Serdal Güvenç, Turkish footballer
 Serdal Kül, Turkish footballer

Turkish masculine given names